Zahra Sarbali Alishah (born 13 August 1993), known as Zahra Sarbali, is an Iranian footballer who plays as a midfielder for Kowsar Women Football League club Bam Khatoon and the Iran women's national team.

References 

1993 births
Living people
Iranian women's footballers
Iran women's international footballers
Women's association football midfielders
People from Tehran Province
21st-century Iranian women